Visa requirements for Russian citizens are administrative entry restrictions by the authorities of other states placed on citizens of Russia. As of 19 July 2022, Russian citizens had visa-free or visa on arrival access to 119 countries and territories, ranking the Russian passport 50th in terms of travel freedom according to the Henley Passport Index.

History

Visa requirements for Russian citizens were lifted (unilaterally or bilaterally, for the first time or repeatedly (in which case, the date of the last cancellation of visas is given) as the Soviet Union  by the following countries/territories: Micronesia (18 December 1980); as the Russian Federation by Dominica (11 March 1993), Cuba (29 July 1994), Antigua and Barbuda (6 November 1996), Malaysia (1998), Namibia (August 2001), Morocco (13 June 2005), Botswana (5 December 2006), Thailand (24 March 2007), Swaziland (12 June 2007), Laos (1 September 2007), Philippines (19 September 2007), Ecuador (20 June 2008), Israel (20 September 2008), Vietnam (1 January 2009), Nicaragua (19 March 2009), Venezuela (6 March 2009), El Salvador and Honduras (31 March 2009), Bahamas (1 April 2009), Guatemala (1 April 2009), Colombia (20 April 2009), Argentina (29 June 2009), Hong Kong (1 July 2009), Brazil (7 June 2010), Guyana (1 August 2010), Trinidad and Tobago (December 2010), Chile (18 January 2011), Turkey (April 2011), Saint Lucia (27 September 2011), Uruguay (27 December 2011), Georgia (until December 2000, visa-free for residents of Caucasian Regions from October 2010, resumed for all citizens on 29 February 2012), Macau (30 September 2012), Mauritius (November 2012), Jamaica (11 March 2013), Saint Kitts and Nevis (28 May 2013), South Korea (1 January 2014), Costa Rica (until 1 February 2008, resumed from 12 April 2014), Panama (14 April 2014), Paraguay (20 October 2014), Mongolia (resumed from 14 November 2014), Tunisia (1 December 2014), Turks and Caicos (2006 – September 2011, resumed in April 2015), Nauru (14 May 2015), Indonesia (10 June 2015), Bolivia (3 October 2016), Senegal (resumed in December 2016), South Africa (30 March 2017), São Tomé and Príncipe (25 April 2017), Qatar (22 June 2017), Brunei (8 January 2018), Taiwan (6 September 2018), Palau (27 December 2018), United Arab Emirates (17 February 2019), Suriname (13 May 2019), Maldives (25 July 2019), Cabo Verde (4 July 2020), Oman (December 2020), Belize (12 January 2022).

Mexico has introduced Electronic Authorization for Russian citizens from 1 November 2010.

Visas on arrival were introduced by Iran (July 2005), Zimbabwe (20 November 2007), Bahrain (November 2008), Guinea-Bissau (April 2012),  Mozambique (resumed in February 2017), Gabon (12 October 2017), Rwanda (1 January 2018), Benin (15 March 2018), Taiwan (6 September 2018), Sierra Leone  (5 September 2019), Saudi Arabia (28 September 2019), Myanmar (1 October 2019), Iraq (15 March 2021).

Russian citizens were made eligible for eVisas by Singapore (December 2009), Sri Lanka (January 2012), Montserrat (September 2012), São Tomé and Príncipe (2012), Myanmar (1 September 2014), India made Russian citizens eligible for the e-Visa (27 November 2014), Kenya (2 July 2015), Gabon (15 June 2015), Australia (Electronic Visitor visa from 1 October 2015), Lesotho (1 May 2017), Saint Helena (2018), Djibouti (18 February 2018), Oman (7 May 2018), Tanzania (26 November 2018), Papua New Guinea (17 June 2019), Saudi Arabia (28 September 2019), Guinea (October 2019), Malawi (November 2019), South Sudan (29 September 2020), Anguilla (January 2021).

The following countries/territories have reinstated visa requirements for Russian citizens: Estonia (1 July 1992), Latvia (20 March 1993), Lithuania (1 November 1993), North Korea (22 May 1997), Turkmenistan (June 1999), Slovenia (December 1999),* Czech Republic (29 May 2000),* Slovakia (1 January 2001),* Hungary (14 June 2001),* Bulgaria (October 2001),* Poland (1 October 2003),* Cyprus (1 January 2004),* Romania (October 2004),* Croatia (1 April 2013),* Kosovo (1 July 2013), Guam and the Northern Mariana Islands (3 October 2019), North Macedonia (21 March 2022), Ukraine (1 July 2022) and Taiwan (31 July 2022).

 * – Visa policy has been synchronized with the visa policy of the EU because of accession of these countries to the European Union.
The provision of visas on arrival to Russian citizens were discontinued by Mali (9 March 2015).

Visa requirements map

Visa requirements 
Visa requirements for holders of normal passports traveling for tourist purposes:

Dependent, disputed, or restricted territories
Unrecognized or partially recognized countries

Dependent and autonomous territories

Other territories
 . Ashmore and Cartier Islands – Special authorisation required.
 . Hainan – Visa on arrival for 15 days. Available at Haikou Meilan International Airport and Sanya Phoenix International Airport. Visa not required for 21 days for traveling as part of a tourist group (2 or more people)
 . Tibet Autonomous Region – Tibet Travel Permit required (10 US Dollars).
 . San Andrés and Leticia – Visitors arriving at Gustavo Rojas Pinilla International Airport and Alfredo Vásquez Cobo International Airport must buy tourist cards on arrival.
 .  Galápagos – Online pre-registration is required. Transit Control Card must also be obtained at the airport prior to departure.
  outside Asmara – To travel in the rest of the country, a Travel Permit for Foreigners is required (20 Eritrean nakfa).
 . Lau Province – Special permission required.
   Mount Athos – Special permit required (4 days: 25 euro for Orthodox visitors, 35 euro for non-Orthodox visitors, 18 euro for students). There is a visitors' quota: maximum 100 Orthodox and 10 non-Orthodox per day and women are not allowed.
 . Protected Area Permit (PAP) required for whole states of Nagaland and Sikkim and parts of states Manipur, Arunachal Pradesh, Uttaranchal, Jammu and Kashmir, Rajasthan, Himachal Pradesh. Restricted Area Permit (RAP) required for all of Andaman and Nicobar Islands and parts of Sikkim. Some of these requirements are occasionally lifted for a year.
 . Kish Island – Visa not required.
 . Closed cities – Special permission required for the town of Baikonur and surrounding areas in Kyzylorda Oblast, and the town of Gvardeyskiy near Almaty.
  outside Pyongyang – Special permit required. People are not allowed to leave the capital city, tourists can only leave the capital with a governmental tourist guide (no independent moving).
 .  Sabah and  Sarawak – Visa not required. These states have their own immigration authorities and passport is required to travel to them, however the same visa applies.
  outside Malé – Permission required. Tourists are generally prohibited from visiting non-resort islands without the express permission of the Government of Maldives.
  Mecca and Medina – Special access required. Non-Muslims and those following the Ahmadiyya religious movement are strictly prohibited from entry.
 . Darfur – Separate travel permit is required.
  outside Khartoum – All foreigners traveling more than 25 kilometers outside of Khartoum must obtain a travel permit.
 . Gorno-Badakhshan Autonomous Province – OIVR permit required (15+5 Tajikistani Somoni) and another special permit (free of charge) is required for Lake Sarez.
 . Closed cities – A special permit, issued prior to arrival by Ministry of Foreign Affairs, is required if visiting the following places: Atamurat, Cheleken, Dashoguz, Serakhs and Serhetabat.
 . Closed city of Mercury, Nevada, United States – Special authorization is required for entry into Mercury.
 . United States Minor Outlying Islands – Special permits required for Baker Island, Howland Island, Jarvis Island, Johnston Atoll, Kingman Reef, Midway Atoll, Palmyra Atoll and Wake Island.
 . Margarita Island – Visa not required. All visitors are fingerprinted.
 . Phú Quốc – Visa not required for 30 days.
  outside Sana'a or Aden – Special permission needed for travel outside Sana'a or Aden.
  UN Buffer Zone in Cyprus – Access Permit is required for travelling inside the zone, except Civil Use Areas.
  Korean Demilitarized Zone – Restricted area.
  UNDOF Zone and Ghajar – Restricted area.

Visa replacement
Certain countries waive the visa requirement if the visitor is in the possession of a valid visa or residence card of another country.
  – Permanent residents of Canada, EU or USA; or holders of a valid USA visa do not require a visa.

Non-ordinary passports
Holders of diplomatic or service Russian passports have visa-free access to the following additional countries and territories (mutual and unilateral):

Longer period of stay or more beneficial terms than that for ordinary passport holders is provided by Argentina, Bosnia and Herzegovina, Brazil, Chile, Colombia, Guatemala, Guyana, Honduras, South Korea, Montenegro, Nicaragua, North Macedonia, Panama, Paraguay, Peru, Philippines, El Salvador, Serbia, Thailand, Turkey, Uruguay, Venezuela.

Holders of diplomatic and service Russian passports do not have visa-free access to Israel.

APEC Business Travel Card

Holders of an APEC Business Travel Card (ABTC)  travelling on business do not require a visa to the following countries:

1 – up to 90 days
2 – up to 60 days
3 – up to 59 days

The card must be used in conjunction with a passport and has the following advantages:
 undertake legitimate business in participating economies
 expedited border crossing in all member economies, including transitional members
 expedited scheduling of visa interview (United States)

Limitations on passport use
 : As a result of the Arab League boycott of Israel, many Arab League countries refuse entry to travelers whose passport shows evidence of entry into Israel or hold an unused Israeli visa.
 Iran: Admission is refused for holders of passports containing an Israeli visa/stamp in the last 12 months
 : As part of the anti-Armenian policies of Azerbaijan, Azerbaijan refuses entry to individuals of Armenian descent, including those who hold Russian Federation or other passports. It also strictly refuses entry to foreigners in general whose passport shows evidence of entry into the self-proclaimed Nagorno-Karabakh Republic, declaring them a so-called personae non gratae.

Vaccination
Many African countries, including Angola, Benin, Burkina Faso, Cameroon, Central African Republic, Chad, Democratic Republic of the Congo, Republic of the Congo, Côte d'Ivoire, Equatorial Guinea, Gabon, Ghana, Guinea, Liberia, Mali, Mauritania, Niger, Rwanda, São Tomé and Príncipe, Senegal, Sierra Leone, Uganda, Zambia require all incoming passengers to have a current International Certificate of Vaccination. Some other countries require vaccination only if the passenger is coming from an infected area.

Passport validity
Many countries require passport validity of no less than 6 months and one or two blank pages.

Foreign travel statistics

See also

 Visa policy of Russia
 Russian passport
 List of diplomatic missions in Russia
 Visa history of Russia

References and notes
References

Notes

External links
 List of countries with visa-free entry to Russia (in Russian), 1 March 2018
 Timatic – Visa & Passport Information (a web page linking to TIMATIC, the official information maintained and used by IATA)

Russia
Foreign relations of Russia